"The Jolly Green Giant" is a song written by Lynn Easton, Don Harris, and Dewey Terry and performed by The Kingsmen.  It reached #1 on the Canadian chart, #4 on the U.S. pop chart, and #25 on the U.S. R&B chart in 1965.  It was featured on their 1965 album The Kingsmen Volume 3.  The song was based on Green Giant's mascot the Jolly Green Giant.  The single originally only credited Easton as the writer, but Harris and Terry were later added when it was determined the song was a re-write of The Olympics song "Big Boy Pete".

The song was arranged by The Kingsmen and produced by Jerry Dennon.

The song ranked #39 on Billboard magazine's Top 100 singles of 1965.

Other versions
Sandy Nelson released a version of the song on his 1965 album Drum Discotheque.
The Ravens released a version of the song as the B-side to their 1965 single "Listen to Me Now".
The Royal Guardsmen released a version of the song on their 1967 album Snoopy vs. the Red Baron.
Don and the Goodtimes released a version of the song on their 1995 compilation album Don & the Goodtimes.
The Knickerbockers released a version of the song on their 1998 compilation album The Very Best of the Knickerbockers: Lies.
Several other 1965 versions with uncredited groups were released on various "hit parade" labels including Hit, Hit Parader, and Seeburg Rec-O-Dance.

References

1964 songs
1964 singles
The Kingsmen songs
Sandy Nelson songs
RPM Top Singles number-one singles